Strhaře is a municipality and village in Brno-Country District in the South Moravian Region of the Czech Republic. It has about 100 inhabitants.

Administrative parts
The village of Žleby is an administrative part of Strhaře.

References

Villages in Brno-Country District